Eric Dick is an American insurance lawyer who specializes in denied or underpaid property insurance claims. He represented thousands of people affected by the events such as Hurricane Harvey and 2020 Houston explosion. He is also known for the lawsuits to overturn Houston charitable feeding ban and term limits extension.

Dick is the head of the Houston law firm Dick Law Firm, PLLC which he established in 2008. He also serves as the president of the Harris County Board of Education since 2017.

Early life and education
Eric Dick was born and raised in Houston, Texas. In his twenties he was a Papa John's pizza delivery driver.

Dick received an associate degree from Houston Community College, a bachelor's degree in business administration from the University of Phoenix, Juris Doctor degree from Western Michigan University Cooley Law School, an LL.M. in taxation from the University of Alabama School of Law, and an MBA from Rice University.

Electoral history
Dick's ran for public office was in 2013. In Houston Mayoral Election he received 10% of the vote when running against incumbent Annise Parker and Ben Hall.

In 2015, in the race for At-Large Position 2 of the Houston City Council he received over 35,000 votes in a race against incumbent David W. Robinson and Willie R. Davis.

In 2016 he defeated Marilyn Burgess and was elected as a Trustee for the Harris County Department of Education Board of Trustees, Position 2, Precinct 4.

In 2019 general election for Houston City Council At-large Position 5 Dick was in a runoff and received over 80,000 votes.

In 2022 general election for Harris County Treasurer he received over 58,000 votes in the Republican primary.

Other
 He is widely known for his “Hire a Dick!” commercials.
 In 2018–2019 he hosted The Eric Dick Show on Houston talk radio station, KPRC (AM).
 In 2021 Eric Dick wrote a book on the history of Texas, Come & Take It.

References

External links
 Eric Dick's profile at Dick Law Firm, PLLC
 Eric Dick article in Ballotpedia

Lawyers from Houston
University of Alabama School of Law alumni
Western Michigan University alumni
University of Phoenix alumni
Living people
Year of birth missing (living people)